Schmidt Ocean Institute (SOI) is a 501(c)(3) non-profit operating foundation established in March 2009 by Eric Schmidt and Wendy Schmidt. The Institute's goal is to advance innovative oceanographic research and discovery through technological advancement, collaborative research, outreach and education, and open sharing of information. SOI supports oceanographic research by providing collaborators with free ship time aboard their research vessel Falkor (too) and expert technical shipboard support. Collaborating researchers and institutions utilizing Falkor commit to openly share and communicate the outcomes of their research, including raw observations and data. Research proposals are reviewed through a peer-reviewed process and assessed based on their potential for technological innovation, oceanographic research, and overall impact. Since its inception in 2009, SOI has supported over 60 expeditions all around the globe.

Research vessels

The Schmidt Ocean Institute has operated two research vessels, R/V Lone Ranger and R/V Falkor. The Lone Ranger, a 255-foot former ocean tug, was donated to the Institute by Peter B. Lewis in 2009 and was operated by the Institute to support research in Bermuda and the Bahamas. 

In 2012 the Schmidt Ocean Institute completed the retrofit of a former German Fisheries protection vessel into a state-of-the-art oceanographic research vessel. The newly retrofitted vessel was renamed R/V Falkor after the luckdragon from The Neverending Story. R/V Falkor became fully operational for scientific use in 2013 following a year of sea trials. Since then, Falkor has hosted numerous international science teams and institutes, successfully supporting oceanographic research. In 2015, R/V Falkor became the first oceanographic research vessel with a high-performance computing system expanding data storage and processing capabilities.

Expeditions and notable discoveries 

Schmidt Ocean Institute research is focused on oceanographic exploration, seafloor mapping, and marine technology innovation. Researchers aboard R/V Falkor have discovered many new species, as well as new seafloor features and environments utilizing the ships onboard mapping technologies and ROV SuBastian. 

Notable accomplishments include the discovery of the world’s deepest known living fish, among several new species in the Mariana Trench. In March of 2020, ROV SuBastian recorded footage of a Siphonophore off the coast of Australia that is likely the longest animal on Earth. 

R/V Falkor’s advanced multibeam mapping capabilities enabled the discovery of 14 new underwater features and mapped over one million square kilometers of the seafloor.

Important discoveries have been made in hydrothermal vent and cold seep environments. During the Microbial Mysteries expedition, researchers discovered large venting mineral towers that reach up to 23 meters in height featuring volcanic flanges that create the illusion of looking at a mirror when observing the superheated hydrothermal fluids beneath them. Expeditions on R/V Falkor have more than doubled the number of known hydrothermal vent sites in the Mariana Back-arc region and discovered a recently-erupted underwater lava field. In 2016, an Unmanned Aerial Vehicle (UAV) with scientific instruments completed the first-ever successful mission launched from a ship without the help of a launching system.

Schmidt Ocean Institute testified before the United States House of Representatives Committee on Science, Space, and Technology, Environment Subcommittee in 2019 to discuss ocean exploration including how it benefits society and is important to assess changes in ocean conditions.

In the year 2020 the  Schmidt Ocean Institute’s seafloor mapping technology (SV  Falkor ) discovered the largest peaked coral reef at the  Great Barrier Reef reaching a height of more than 1,640 feet tall, the first of its kind discovered in more than 120 years.

Outreach 
Schmidt Ocean Institute engages in a number of outreach and education activities in order to promote the research conducted aboard the ship. Some of Schmidt Ocean Institute's outreach activities include public ship tours, ship-to-shore connections, art exhibits, weekly blog posts, and social media updates. In addition, all ROV dives are live-streamed for public viewing.

Artist-at-Sea and Student Opportunities 
SOI provides opportunities for artists and student oceanographers to take part in research expeditions through Student Opportunities and Artist-at-Sea programs. Artist-at-Sea participants collaborate with the science team to create pieces inspired by oceanographic research. Pieces from the Artist-at-Sea program have been displayed around the world in a traveling exhibit. The Student Opportunities program provides undergraduate and graduate students a chance to take part in seagoing scientific research.

References

External links
Schmidt Ocean Institute official website

Non-profit organizations based in California
Oceanographic organizations
Organizations based in Palo Alto, California
Scientific organizations established in 2009
2009 establishments in California